Henri Gadeau de Kerville (17 December 1858 in Rouen – 26 July 1940 in Bagnères-de-Luchon) was a French zoologist, entomologist, botanist and archeologist best known for his photographs of these subjects and especially for his work "Les Insectes phosphorescents: notes complémentaires et bibliographie générale (anatomie physiologie et biologie): avec quatre planches chromolithographiées", Rouen, L. Deshays, 1881.

Personal life
He was educated at the Lycée Pierre Corneille in Rouen. He was a member of the Société des sciences naturelles et amis du Museum de Rouen (1878), the Société botanique de France (1882) and the Société préhistorique française (1911). In 1910 he founded a laboratory for experimental speleobiology in Saint-Paër. The Société zoologique de France and Société entomologique de France each offers a "Prix Gadeau de Kerville" for achievements in their respective fields.

His scientific collections and photographs brought back from his expeditions are kept at museums in Paris, London, Elbeuf and Rouen.

Selected writings
 Les Insectes phosphorescents: notes complémentaires et bibliographie générale (anatomie physiologie et biologie): avec quatre planches chromolithographiées (Phosphorescent insects: general notes and bibliography (anatomy, physiology and biology) with four chromolithographic boards), 1881.
 Mélanges entomologiques, (Entomological melanges), 1883-1936.
 Les Animaux et les Végétaux lumineux, 1890.
 Les Vieux Arbres de la Normandie; étude botanico-historique (Ancient trees of Normandy; botanico-historical study), 1890-.
 L'Évolution du chien dans les sociétés humaines (The evolution of the dog in human society), Société d'éditions scientifiques, Paris, 1900.
 Voyage zoologique d'Henri Gadeau de Kerville en Asie-Mineure, (Zoological voyages of Henri Gadeau de Kerville in Asia Minor), 1900-.
 Resultat des fouilles effectuées dans un abri sous roche, à Bonnières (Seine-et-Oise) et découverte d'une sépulture néolithique dans l'abri de la Roche-Galerne, à Jeufosse (Seine-et-Oise), (Result of excavations in a rock shelter at Bonnières (Seine-et-Oise) and discovery of a Neolithic grave in the shelter of the Roche-Galerne at Jeufosse (Seine-et-Oise), 1911.
 Considérations et recherches expérimentales sur la direction des racines et des tiges, (Considerations and experimental research involving the direction of roots and stems), 1917.
 Notes sur les fougères, (Notes on ferns), 1922.
 Crustacés copépodes récoltés par M. Henri Gadeau de Kerville pendant son voyage zoologique en Syrie (avril-juin 1908), (Copepod crustaceans collected by Henri Gadeau de Kerville during his trip to Syria in April/June 1908), 1926.
 Distractions littéraires d'un biologiste (Literary distractions of a biologist), Librairie Universitaire J. Gamber, Paris, 1933.

References

1858 births
1940 deaths
Scientists from Rouen
French entomologists
Lycée Pierre-Corneille alumni
19th-century French botanists
19th-century French zoologists
20th-century French botanists
20th-century French zoologists